Sex Change is the eighth studio album by Trans Am, released in 2007.

Track listing
 "First Words" – 4:14
 "North East Rising Sun" – 4:45
 "Obscene Strategies" – 3:45
 "Conspiracy of the Gods" – 4:33
 "Exit Management Solution" – 1:05
 "Climbing up the Ladder (Parts III and IV)" – 3:30
 "4,738 Regrets" – 3:50
 "Reprieve" – 3:38
 "Tesco v. Sainsbury's" – 2:52
 "Shining Path" – 4:09
 "Triangular Pyramid" – 6:41

References

2007 albums
Trans Am (band) albums
Thrill Jockey albums